Hanham is a suburb of Bristol. It is located in the south east of the city. Hanham is in the unitary authority of South Gloucestershire.  It became a civil parish on 1 April 2003.

The post code area of Hanham is BS15. The population of this civil parish taken at the 2011 census was 6,128.

Governance
An electoral ward in the same name exists. The ward stretches south from Hanham to Hanham Abbots. The total population of the ward taken from the 2011 census was 10,311

History

Tom Cribb, once world champion bare-knuckle boxer, was born in Hanham. Stephen Merchant was also born in Hanham.

Hanham is also the first place in the UK to trial Gordon Brown's new eco-towns. Built on the former Hanham Hall Hospital site, the new village serves as a blueprint for Gordon Brown's proposed five eco-towns that will provide up to 100,000 zero-carbon dwellings across the country.

The Blue Bowl has been claimed to be one of the oldest public houses in the country.

References

Villages in South Gloucestershire District
Civil parishes in Gloucestershire
Areas of Bristol